The 1913 UCI Track Cycling World Championships were the World Championship for track cycling. They took place for amateurs in Berlin, Germany and for professionals in Leipzig, Germany from 23 to 31 August 1913. In total four events for men were contested, two for professionals and two for amateurs.

Medal summary

Medal table

References

Track cycling
UCI Track Cycling World Championships by year
International cycle races hosted by Germany
Sports competitions in Berlin
Sports competitions in Leipzig
1913 in track cycling